Dirk Heyne (born 10 October 1957 in Magdeburg, then East Germany) is a former German football goalkeeper turned manager.

Career
Heyne began his footballing career at 1. FC Magdeburg's youth teams in 1967. In 1977, he had his debut in the DDR-Oberliga team and went on to tend goal in 323 Oberliga matches for 1. FC Magdeburg. His international career lasted for more than 11 years but only in the 1989/90 season Heyne was East Germany's first choice goalkeeper. In 1991, after German reunification and Magdeburg's relegation to the tier III NOFV-Oberliga Mitte, Heyne moved to Borussia Mönchengladbach, playing in 24 Bundesliga matches until 1994, when he retired from playing. 
Until 2001 he stayed at Mönchengladbach, holding several positions including the post of goalkeeper coach. In 2001, he returned to 1. FC Magdeburg, coaching the U19 youth team. In 2003, he took over managing the senior team in the tier IV NOFV-Oberliga Süd, leading them to a league title in 2006 and thus winning promotion to the Regionalliga Nord. After a successful first year in the new league, when the team finished third, missing out on promotion to 2. Bundesliga by a mere point, crisis followed. With the team lagging six points behind a non-relegation spot in the 2007–08 season, Dirk Heyne was sacked by the club.
On 4 July 2008, FC Sachsen Leipzig announced they had signed Dirk Heyne as manager for their Regionalliga Nord campaign.

Aside from his manager career, Heyne owns a goalkeeping academy near Magdeburg.

Matches 

1. FC Magdeburg
 323 DDR-Oberliga matches
 51 FDGB Cup matches
 34 UEFA Europa League and UEFA Cup Winners' Cup matches

Borussia Mönchengladbach
 24 Bundesliga matches

East Germany
 9 caps

Honors

Player 
1. FC Magdeburg
 FDGB-Pokal: 1977–78, 1978–79, 1982–83
 DDR-Oberliga: 1977–78 runner-up, 1980–81 third place, 1989–90 third place

Borussia Mönchengladbach
 DFB-Pokal: 1991–92 runner-up

Manager 
1. FC Magdeburg
 NOFV-Oberliga Süd: 2005–06, promotion to Regionalliga Nord
 Saxony-Anhalt Cup: 2005–06

References

External links
 
 Heyne's goalkeeping academy 
 Dirk Heyne at Footballdatabase

1957 births
Living people
German footballers
East German footballers
Association football goalkeepers
Sportspeople from Magdeburg
1. FC Magdeburg players
Bundesliga players
East Germany international footballers
1. FC Magdeburg managers
FC Sachsen Leipzig managers
DDR-Oberliga players
Footballers from Saxony-Anhalt
German football managers